Yealand Storrs is a hamlet in the English county  of Lancashire.

Geography
Yealand Storrs is north of Lancaster near the border with Cumbria, it is in the civil parish of Yealand Redmayne, in the City of Lancaster district.

Gallery

References

External links 

Villages in Lancashire
Geography of the City of Lancaster